The Karel Doorman-class frigates are a series of eight multi-purpose vessels built for the Royal Netherlands Navy. Its namesake is Karel Doorman, a Dutch naval officer whose ship was struck by a Japanese torpedo in the battle of the Java Sea in 1942, and who, as a result of which, went down with his ship.

Design history 
In the 1970s, Dutch naval authorities deemed the s old, outdated, and therefore in need of replacement. This led to the construction of the Karel Doorman-class frigates in the mid 1980s after the Dutch navy had finalised the design and requirements for the frigates at the end of the 1970s and early 1980s.

The design of the M-frigates was made in-house at the Royal Netherlands Navy, in close collaboration with construction site De Schelde in Vlissingen and design agency Nevesbu. For the first time stealth techniques were used in the design, such as the sloping walls of the bridge section. Much attention was also paid to the care and facilities for the crew, with more privacy and improved comfort.

The Karel Doorman class were designed as multi purpose frigates that could perform a wide range of missions. Their armament reflects this by incorporating many features, such as the ability to engage submarines, aircraft and surface vessels. Besides warfare the armaments can also be used to support anti-drug and piracy operations.

Laid down in February 1985 and launched in April 1988, it was commissioned by the Dutch navy in May 1991. Even while the ships were still under construction, Dutch authorities tried, and ultimately failed, to negiotate purchase orders by interested foreign navies.

Armament 
These multi-purpose frigates can be used in the anti-submarine, anti-aircraft, or surface combat roles. Also available is an OTO Melara 76 mm gun, which has both anti-ship and anti-air capabilities.

Air defence is provided by an AIM-7 Sparrow medium-range semi-active radar homing air-to-air missile with a range of up to  Sixteen VLS cells are mounted on the port external bulkhead of the hangar.

For anti submarine warfare, each ship is equipped with two twin torpedo launchers, firing Mark 46 torpedoes; and carries one Westland Lynx helicopter. The helicopter is also armed with 2 Mk 46 torpedoes, and carries dipping sonar and forward looking infrared systems.

List of ships

Sale to foreign navies

Chile 

In 2004 two ships, Tjerk Hiddes and Abraham van der Hulst were sold to Chile and renamed Almirante Riveros (FF-18) and Blanco Encalada (FF-15) respectively. Blanco Encalada commissioned into the Chilean Navy on 16 December 2005, with Almirante Riveros to be commissioned in April 2007.

Belgium 

On 20 July 2005, the Belgian government decided to buy two of the remaining six Dutch M-class frigates to replace the two remaining frigates of the  currently in service with the Belgian Naval Component, which in turn might be sold to Bulgaria. On 21 December 2005, Karel Doorman and Willem van der Zaan were sold to Belgium and renamed Leopold I (F930) and Louise-Marie (F931) respectively. They were recommissioned between 2007 and 2008.

Portugal 

A committee of the Portuguese government arrived in the Netherlands to evaluate the condition of two frigates to be bought.

On 1 November 2006, the Portuguese Defense Minister Nuno Severiano Teixeira signed a contract for the purchase of the frigates Van Nes and Van Galen. Van Nes, renamed NRP Bartolomeu Dias (F333), was transferred to Portugal on 16 January 2009 and Van Galen, renamed NRP Dom Francisco de Almeida (F334) was transferred on 15 January 2010. With the sale of two M-class frigates to Portugal only two of the eight ships remain with the Dutch Navy.

Modernisation 
The Royal Netherlands Navy and Belgian Navy decided to upgrade the four frigates by rebuilding both hangar and helicopter deck for the NH-90 as well to replace the forward mast for fitting the new Thales SeaWatcher 100 phased array surface search radar and Gatekeeper electro-optical surveillance system. The first ship to receive the upgrade was HNLMS Van Speijk (F828) in April 2012, next was BNS Leopold I (F930), followed by HNLMS Van Amstel (F831) and BNS Louise Marie (F931) is currently undergoing the modernization. SMART-S 3D search radars will not be replaced by SMART-S MK2.

Seawatcher 100 is a non-rotating active phased array radar for naval surface surveillance. The system automatically detects and tracks asymmetric threats and very small objects such as swimmers and periscopes in all weather conditions. Seastar can also be used for helicopter guidance. Seastar is internationally marketed as Sea Watcher 100

Gatekeeper is a 360-degree panoramic electro-optical surveillance and alerter system based on IR/TV technology. Designed to counter emerging asymmetric threats down to small boats and swimmers, Gatekeeper increases short-range situational awareness in littoral environments.

In 2018 the Portuguese Navy decided to modernize its two Karel Doorman-class frigates (Mid-life update), the first frigate started modernization in 2018 and was delivered in September 2021, the second frigate started modernization in 2020 and was received in October 2022.

Replacement 

The two multipurpose M-frigates which are still in service with the Royal Netherlands Navy are reaching the end of their life; they were designed to last until 2018/2023. Because of this the Dutch Ministry of Defence started design studies in 2013. The new frigates are again planned to fulfill a general purpose role with anti-submarine warfare as its specialty. However, since the Netherlands Royal Navy only owns six frigates in total by 2017, the new ships have to be able to perform well in all areas of the spectrum. This means that anti-air equipment also has to be present, in the form of VLS (vertical launch)-cells carrying Standard Missile 2 or ESSM-projectiles. Due to budget cuts, the replacement program was delayed and is now projected to deliver the first ships in 2028–29.

First designs 
In November 2013 on a techbase in Amsterdam a 3D-printed model of one of the designs was shown to the public. The ships were going to be, just like their predecessor, multipurpose-frigates with anti-submarine being the main task.
This new class is going to have an integrated mast made by Thales Nederland; the ships of the Holland class did also get this type of mast. At first this new class was to be replacing the Karel Doorman-class vessels in 2020; however, Minister of Defence Jeanine Hennis-Plasschaert had changed this date to 2023. This was subsequently further pushed back to the end of the decade.

By 2017, it was made clear the new 'Future Surface Combatant (Koninklijke Marine)' will be developed in cooperation with the Belgian Marine Component and at least four vessels are to be built (two for the Royal Dutch Navy and two for the Belgian Marine Component), with the possibility more will be ordered as soon as the acquisition procedure reaches a more definitive phase.

See also 
 List of naval ship classes in service

References

Bibliography 
 Joris Janssen Lok, 'The Netherlands: Dutch M frigates are ready for action,' Jane's Defence Weekly, 14 October 1995

External links 

 Karel Doorman class
  Schelde Shipbuilding: Multipurpose Frigates

Frigate classes